Daniel H. Boman (born December 7, 1974) is a former Democratic member of the Alabama House of Representatives, representing the 16th District. He was defeated by Republican Kyle South in November 2014.

Early life, education, and law career 
Boman received an A.A. degree from Bevill State Community College, a B.A. degree in psychology from Auburn University, and a J.D. degree from the Birmingham School of Law.

Alabama House of Representatives

Tenure 
Boman was elected to the state house as a Republican in the massive Republican wave that swept through the state in the 2010 elections, one which saw the Republicans take complete control of state government for the first time since Reconstruction.  He defeated incumbent Democrat William Thigpen 54%-46%.  He attracted national attention in May 2011 when he switched parties and became a Democrat in protest of Republican support for an education bill. Opponents of the bill argued that it was unfair to teachers facing firing or other adverse action. In explaining his decision, Boman said: "During this current session I have seen this legislative body pass bills that I feel adversely affect what my people back home want, need, and deserve...I will never choose the Party over the people again."

Committee assignments 
Judiciary
Ethics and Campaign Finance
Tuscaloosa County Legislation

2012 Congressional election 

He did not have to give up his state house seat to run for Congress; Alabama state representatives serve four-year terms. He was defeated in the general election.

2018 State Senate Race 
Boman has announced his intention to run as a Republican in the 2018 Republican primary for District 6 State Senate seat.

Personal life 
Boman is married and has three children.

References

External links 
 Representative Daniel Boman at the Alabama House of Representatives
Daniel Boman for Congress official campaign website
 
Campaign contributions at OpenSecrets.org

Living people
Republican Party members of the Alabama House of Representatives
1974 births
People from Sulligent, Alabama
Democratic Party members of the Alabama House of Representatives